The South American Futsal World Cup qualifiers is a futsal tournament organized by CONMEBOL to determine which South American teams qualified for the FIFA Futsal World Cup. The tournament has been organized every four years since 2012. Prior to it, the Copa América de Futsal was used as the South American qualifying tournament.

In general, the top four teams of the tournament qualify for the FIFA Futsal World Cup. However, if the World Cup hosts are from South America, only the top three teams plus the World Cup hosts qualify, such as in 2016 when Colombia were the World Cup hosts.

Results

Medal summary

See also
Copa América de Futsal

References

External links
 

 
CONMEBOL
CONMEBOL competitions
Futsal competitions in South America